A number of steamships were named Martha Hendrik Fisser, including –
 , a German cargo ship in service 1935–40
 , a West German cargo ship in service 1950–58

Ship names